Worldwide Commodity Partners Limited was a company that sold carbon credits, for which there is no functioning secondary market, at inflated prices and which was wound-up by British regulatory authorities in 2014 in the public interest following an investigation by the Insolvency Service. It was one of a web of 13 companies that also included Eco-Synergies Limited that were shut down at the same time.

Worldwide Commodity Partners had been named "Fastest Growing Broker, Western Europe, 2012" in the World Finance Awards.

See also
Tullett Brown

References

External links

Financial services companies established in 2011
Financial services companies based in the City of London
Financial services companies disestablished in 2014
Fraud in England